Desacetoxyvindoline is a terpene indole alkaloid produced by the plant Catharanthus roseus.  Desacetoxyvindoline is a product formed by the methylation of the nitrogen on the indole ring by the enzyme 3-hydroxy-16-methoxy-2,3-dihydrotabersonine N-methyltransferase (NMT).  The metabolite is a substrate for desacetoxyvindoline 4-hydroxylase (D4H) which catalyzes a hydroxylation to yield deacetylvindoline.

References

Tryptamine alkaloids
Carbazoles
Heterocyclic compounds with 5 rings
Methyl esters
Methoxy compounds